Hyperolius pardalis is a species of frog in the family Hyperoliidae.
It is found in Cameroon, Central African Republic, Republic of the Congo, Equatorial Guinea, Gabon, and possibly Democratic Republic of the Congo.
Its natural habitats are subtropical or tropical moist lowland forests, rivers, swamps, freshwater marshes, intermittent freshwater marshes, rural gardens, heavily degraded former forest, and ponds.

References

pardalis
Amphibians described in 1948
Taxonomy articles created by Polbot